Agathoxylon (also known by the synonyms Dadoxylon and Araucarioxylon) is a form genus of fossil wood, including massive tree trunks. Although identified from the late Palaeozoic to the end of the Mesozoic, Agathoxylon is common from the Carboniferous to Triassic. Agathoxylon represents the wood of multiple conifer groups, including both Araucariaceae and Cheirolepidiaceae.

Description
Agathoxylon were large trees that bore long strap-like leaves and trunks with small, narrow rays. Often the original cellular structure is preserved as a result of silica in solution in the ground water becoming deposited within the wood cells. This mode of fossilization is termed permineralization.

Systematics
As a genus, Dadoxylon was poorly defined, and apart from Araucariaceae, has been associated with fossil wood as diverse as Cordaitales, Glossopteridales and Podocarpaceae. Furthermore, it may be the same form genus as Araucarioxylon, hence the usage Dadoxylon (Araucarioxylon). The genus Agathoxylon, classified under the family Araucariaceae, has nomenclatural priority over the genera Araucarioxylon and Dadoxylon.

Several Dadoxylon species, such as D. brandlingii and D. saxonicum have been identified as Araucarites. D. arberi and D. sp.1 were synonymised with the glossopterid species Australoxylon teixterae and A. natalense, respectively; while D. sp. 2 was transferred to Protophyllocladoxylon.

Species
Agathoxylon arizonicum [=Araucarioxylon arizonicum] Chinle Formation, Arizona, New Mexico, United States Late Triassic 
Agathoxylon africanum (Bamford 1999) [=Araucarioxylon africanum]: Daptocephalus Assemblage Zone, Middleton Formation and Normandien Formation to Cynognathus Assemblage Zone, Burgersdorp Formation and Driekoppen Formation, Beaufort Group, South Africa, and Lebung Group, Botswana
Agathoxylon agathioides (Kräusel & Jain): La Matilde Formation, Argentina
Agathoxylon antarcticus (Poole & Cantrill 2001) Pujana et al. 2014 [=A. matildense, Araucarioxylon antarcticus]: Santa Marta Formation, Antarctica
Agathoxylon arberi (Seward 1919) [=Dadoxylon arberi]
Agathoxylon australe[=Dadoxylon australe]
Agathoxylon bougheyi Williams [=Dadoxylon bougheyi]: Madumabisa Mudstone Formation, Zambia and Somabula Beds, Zimbabwe
Agathoxylon cordaianum Hartig 1848
Agathoxylon desnoyersii (Phillipe 2011) [=Araucarioxylon desnoyersii]
Agathoxylon duplicatum (Vogellehner 1965) [=Dadoxylon duplicatum]: Germany
Agathoxylon jamudhiense (Maheshwari 1963) [=Dadoxylon jamudhiense]: India
Agathoxylon karooensis (Bamford 1999) [=Araucarioxylon karooensis]: Daptocephalus AZ, Middleton and Normandien Formations, South Africa
Agathoxylon kellerense (Lucas and Lacey 1984) [=Araucarioxylon kellerense, Dadoxylon kellerense]: Santa Marta Formation, Antarctica
Agathoxylon lemonii Tidwell & Thayn 1986: Dakota Formation, Utah
Agathoxylon maharashtraensis (Prasad 1982) [=Dadoxylon maharashtraensis]: India
Agathoxylon parenchymatosum (Vogellehner 1965) [=Araucarioxylon parenchymatosum, Dadoxylon parenchymatosum]: Forest Sandstone Formation, Botswana
Agathoxylon pseudoparenchymatosum (Gothan 1908) Pujana et al. 2014 [=Araucarioxylon chilense, A. kerguelense, A. novaezeelandii, A. pseudoparenchymatosum, Dadoxylon kaiparaense, D. kergulense, D. pseudoparenchymatosum]: Santa Marta Formation, Antarctica
Agathoxylon santacruzense Kloster and Gnaedinger 2018: La Matilde Formation, Argentina
Agathoxylon santalense (Sah & Jain): La Matilde Formation, Argentina
Agathoxylon sclerosum (Walton) Kräusel 1956 [=Dadoxylon sclerosum, Kaokoxylon sclerosum]: Malay Peninsula, Dwyka Group to Molteno Formation, Stormberg Group, South Africa, and Ntawere Formation, Zambia
Agathoxylon termieri (Attims) Gnaedinger & Herbst: La Matilde Formation, Argentina
Agathoxylon ulmitus Iamandei & Iamandei 2004: Romania
Agathoxylon woodworthii (Knowlton 1899) [=Dadoxylon woodworthii]: United States

Distribution
Agathoxylon is common in many parts of the world, found in sites of both Gondwana and Laurasia and reported from southern Africa, Asia, the Middle East, Europe, South America, and North America.

In southern Africa, Agathoxylon is widespread in the Karoo Supergroup. In Zimbabwe, it is especially encountered in the Pebbly Arkose Formation, and also reported frequently from the Angwa Sandstone Formation.

References

Araucariaceae
Paleozoic genus first appearances
Mesozoic genera
Late Cretaceous genus extinctions
Paleozoic life of New Brunswick
Paleozoic life of Nova Scotia
Paleozoic life of Prince Edward Island
Fossils of Antarctica
Fossils of Argentina
Fossils of Botswana
Fossils of Germany
Fossils of India
Fossils of Namibia
Fossils of Romania
Fossils of South Africa
Fossils of Turkey
Fossils of Zambia
Fossils of Zimbabwe
Fossil taxa described in 1848
Prehistoric gymnosperm genera